San Lázaro de la Cruz (born 20 January 1950) is a Dominican Republic former weightlifter. He competed in the men's flyweight event at the 1976 Summer Olympics.

References

External links
 

1950 births
Living people
Dominican Republic male weightlifters
Olympic weightlifters of the Dominican Republic
Weightlifters at the 1976 Summer Olympics
Sportspeople from San Pedro de Macorís
Medalists at the 1975 Pan American Games
Medalists at the 1979 Pan American Games
Pan American Games silver medalists for the Dominican Republic
Pan American Games bronze medalists for the Dominican Republic
Pan American Games medalists in weightlifting
20th-century Dominican Republic people
21st-century Dominican Republic people